This was the first time that the super heavyweight weight class was competed at an Olympics.  The event was delayed one day due to the ongoing Munich massacre.

Results
The results were determined by adding the points for best lifts in military press, snatch and jerk, with any ties broken by the minimum bodyweight.

Final

Key: OR = Olympic record; DNF = did not finish; NVL = no valid lift

References

External links
Official report

Weightlifting at the 1972 Summer Olympics